Martin Ritt (March 2, 1914 – December 8, 1990) was an American director and actor who worked in both film and theater, noted for his socially conscious films.

Some of the films he directed include The Long, Hot Summer (1958), The Black Orchid (1958), Paris Blues (1961), Hemingway's Adventures of a Young Man (1962), Hud (1963), The Spy Who Came in from the Cold (1965), Hombre (1967), The Great White Hope (1970), Sounder (1972), The Front (1976), Norma Rae (1979), Cross Creek (1983), Murphy's Romance (1985), Nuts (1987), and Stanley & Iris (1990).

Early career and influences

Ritt was born to a Jewish family  in Manhattan, the son of immigrant parents. He graduated from DeWitt Clinton High School in the Bronx.

Ritt originally attended and played football for Elon College in North Carolina. The stark contrasts of the depression-era South, against his New York City upbringing, instilled in him a passion for expressing the struggles of inequality, which is apparent in the films he directed.

Early theatre
After leaving St. John's University, Ritt found work with a theater group, and began acting in plays. His first performance was as Crown in Porgy and Bess. After his performance drew favorable reviews, Ritt concluded that he could "only be happy in the theater."

Ritt then went to work with the Roosevelt administration's New Deal Works Progress Administration as a playwright for the Federal Theater Project, a federal government-funded theater support program. With work hard to find and the Depression in full effect, many WPA theater performers, directors, and writers became heavily influenced by the radical left and Communism, and Ritt was no exception. Years later, Ritt would state that he had never been a member of the Communist Party, although he considered himself a leftist and found common ground with some Marxist principles.

Group Theatre
Ritt moved on from the WPA to the Theater of Arts, then to the Group Theatre in New York City. There, he met Elia Kazan, who cast Ritt as an understudy to his play Golden Boy.  Ritt continued his association with Kazan for well over a decade, later assisting—and sometimes filling in for—Kazan at The Actors Studio. He eventually became one of the Studio's few non-performing life members.

World War II
During World War II, Ritt served with the U.S. Army Air Forces and appeared as an actor in the Air Forces' Broadway play and film Winged Victory.

During the Broadway run of the play, Ritt directed a production of Sidney Kingsley's play Yellow Jack, using actors from Winged Victory and rehearsing between midnight and 3 am after Winged Victory performances.

The play had a brief Broadway run and was performed again in Los Angeles when the Winged Victory troupe moved there to make the film version.

Television and the Blacklist

After working as a playwright with the WPA, acting on stage, and directing hundreds of plays, Ritt became a successful television director and producer. He produced and directed episodes of Danger, Somerset Maugham TV Theatre (1950–51), Starlight Theatre (1951), and The Plymouth Playhouse (1953).

Blacklist
In 1952, Ritt was caught up by the Red Scare and investigations of communist influence in Hollywood and the movie industry. Although not directly named by the House Un-American Activities Committee (HUAC), Ritt was mentioned in an anticommunist newsletter called Counterattack, published by American Business Consultants, a group formed by three former FBI agents.

Counterattack alleged that Ritt had helped Communist Party-affiliated locals of the New York-based Retail, Wholesale and Department Store Union stage their annual show. Also cited was a show he had directed for Russian War Relief at Madison Square Garden. His associations with the Group Theater, founded on a Russian model, and the Federal Theater Project (which Congress had stopped funding in 1939 because of what some anti-New Deal congressmen claimed to be a left-wing political tone to some productions), were also known to HUAC.  He was finally blacklisted by the television industry when a Syracuse grocer charged him with donating money to Communist China in 1951.  He supported himself for five years by teaching at the Actors Studio.

Career in Hollywood

Edge of the City
Unable to work in the television industry, Ritt returned to the theater for several years.  By 1956, the Red Scare had decreased in intensity, and he turned to film directing.  His first film as director was Edge of the City (1957), an important film for Ritt and an opportunity to give voice to his experiences.  Based on the story of a union dock worker who faces intimidation by a corrupt boss, the film incorporates many themes that were to influence Ritt over the years: corruption, racism, intimidation of the individual by the group, defense of the individual against government oppression, and most notably, the redeeming quality of mercy and the value of shielding others from evil, even at the cost of sacrificing one's own reputation, career, or life.

Joanne Woodward and Paul Newman
Ritt went on to direct 25 more films. Producer Jerry Wald  signed him to direct No Down Payment (1957) with Joanne Woodward. Wald later used Ritt on two adaptations of William Faulkner novels, both with Woodward: The Long, Hot Summer (1958) with Paul Newman, a big hit, and The Sound and the Fury (1959) with Yul Brynner, a flop.

In between, he directed The Black Orchid (1958) at Paramount, and he then did 5 Branded Women (1960) in Europe.

Ritt directed Paris Blues (1961) with Woodward and Newman. He made one more film with Wald, Hemingway's Adventures of a Young Man (1962).

Ritt and Newman had a big hit with Hud (1963).

Ritt's 1964 film The Outrage is an American retelling of the Kurosawa film Rashomon, and stars Laurence Harvey, Paul Newman, Claire Bloom, Edward G. Robinson, Howard da Silva, and William Shatner.  Like Kurosawa's film, Ritt employs flashbacks in his film. Paul Newman was fond of this role.  He traveled to Mexico and spent time speaking to local residents to study the accents.  Newman liked that the film's narrative included different points of view.

Ritt directed The Spy Who Came in from the Cold (1965) with Richard Burton, then one more movie with Newman, Hombre (1967).  He ended the '60s with The Brotherhood (1968).

1970s

In the 1970s, Ritt won acclaim for movies such as The Molly Maguires (1970), The Great White Hope (1970) (earning Oscar nominations for James Earl Jones and Jane Alexander), Sounder (1972), Pete 'n' Tillie (1972), and Conrack (1974) (from Pat Conroy's autobiographical novel).

After Warner Bros. Pictures brought the film rights to First Blood in 1973 Ritt was hired to direct from a screenplay by Walter Newman, featuring Paul Newman as John Rambo and Robert Mitchum as Sheriff Will Teasle. However his version of the film was not made.

In 1976, Ritt made one of the first dramatic feature films about the blacklist, The Front, starring Woody Allen. The Front satirizes the use of "fronts", men and women who (either as a personal favor or in exchange for payment) allowed their names to be listed as writers for scripts actually authored by blacklisted writers. The film was based on the experiences of, and written by, one of Ritt's closest friends, screenwriter Walter Bernstein, who was blacklisted for eight years beginning in 1950.

Ritt ended the decade with Casey's Shadow (1978) and Norma Rae (1979) (Oscar for Sally Field as Best Actress).

Final Films

Ritt made Back Roads (1981) with Sally Field, and Cross Creek (1983), the story of Marjorie Kinnan Rawlings, author of The Yearling. It was nominated for (but did not win) four Oscars, including Best Supporting Actress Alfre Woodard and Best Supporting Actor Rip Torn. He directed Murphy's Romance (1985), also starring Field.

In 1987, Ritt again used extensive flashback and nonlinear storytelling techniques in the film Nuts, based on the stage play of the same name, written by Tom Topor. The film was considered a box-office disappointment in relation to its budget, although it did not actually lose money.

Ritt's final film was Stanley & Iris (1990).

Personal life 
Ritt and his wife Adele had a daughter, film producer Martina Wernerand, and a son, Michael.

Ritt died of heart disease at age 76 in Santa Monica, California, on December 8, 1990.

Honors
 Nominated, Palme d'Or Cannes Film Festival - The Long, Hot Summer (1958)
 Nominated, Best Director Directors Guild of America - The Long, Hot Summer (1958)
 Nominated, Golden Lion Award Venice Film Festival - The Black Orchid (1958)
 Nominated, Best Director Golden Globe - Hemingway's Adventures of a Young Man (1962)
 Nominated, Best Director Academy Award - Hud (1963)
 Nominated, Best Director Directors Guild of America - Hud (1963)
 Nominated, Best Director Golden Globe - Hud (1963)
 Nominated, Best Director New York Film Critics Circle - Hud (1963)
 Winner, OCIC Award Venice Film Festival - Hud (1963)
 Nominated, Golden Lion Award Venice Film Festival - Hud (1963)
 Winner, Best British Film BAFTA - The Spy Who Came in from the Cold (1965)
 Nominated, Best Director Directors Guild of America - Sounder (1972) 
 Winner, Technical Grand Prize Cannes Film Festival - Norma Rae (1979)
 Nominated, Palme d'Or Cannes Film Festival - Norma Rae (1979)
 Nominated, Palme d'Or Cannes Film Festival - Cross Creek (1983)

Selected films

Edge of the City (1957)
No Down Payment (1957)
The Long Hot Summer (1958)
The Black Orchid (1958)
The Sound and the Fury (1959)
5 Branded Women (1960)
Paris Blues (1961)
Hemingway's Adventures of a Young Man (1962)
Hud (1963)
The Outrage (1964)
The Spy Who Came in from the Cold (1965)
Hombre (1967)
The Brotherhood (1968)
The Great White Hope (1970)
The Molly Maguires (1970)
Sounder (1972)
Pete 'n' Tillie (1972)
Awake and Sing! (1972 - TV)
Conrack (1974)
The Front (1976)
Casey's Shadow (1978)
Norma Rae (1979)
Back Roads (1981)
Cross Creek (1983)
Murphy's Romance (1985)
Nuts (1987)
Stanley & Iris (1990)

See also

Harriet Frank Jr. and Irving Ravetch, a screenwriting couple with whom Ritt collaborated extensively.

References

External links
 
 
 

Film directors from New York City
Jewish American male actors
American male stage actors
American theatre directors
BAFTA winners (people)
Hollywood blacklist
1914 births
1990 deaths
Works Progress Administration workers
20th-century American male actors
DeWitt Clinton High School alumni
20th-century American Jews
Federal Theatre Project people